The 2008–09 Gamma Ethniki was the 26th season since the official establishment of the third tier of Greek football in 1983. It started on September 14, 2008 and finished on May 3, 2009. 36 teams contest the league, divided into two groups of 18 clubs each, using certain geographical criteria. 23 of the participant clubs have contested in the 2007-08 season, 3 of them have been relegated from Beta Ethniki, while 10 of them have been promoted from Delta Ethniki. Last season's champions of North Group were Kavala, and Diagoras of South Group.

Participant clubs

Following clubs were relegated from Beta Ethniki last season:

Egaleo
Chaidari
Agios Dimitrios

Following clubs secured a place in Gamma Ethniki by avoiding relegation or by failing to win promotion:

Aias Salamina
Aiolikos (withdrew)
Neos Asteras Rethymno
Atsalenios
Fostiras
Ilioupoli
Korinthos
Koropi
Panachaiki 2005
Rodos
Vyzas
Alexandroupoli Enosi (dismissed)
Anagennisi Arta (withdrew)
Anagennisi Giannitsa
Doxa Drama (taking the place of Ethnikos Olympiacos Volos after the two Olympiacos Volos clubs' merger in summer 2008)
Eordaikos 2007
Ethnikos Katerini
Lamia
Neoi Epivates
Niki Volos
Panetolikos
Preveza
Thermaikos

Following clubs were promoted to Gamma Ethniki as champions of their respective Delta Ethniki groups:

Odysseas Anagennisi
Makedonikos Neapoli
Pyrsos
Ethnikos Filippiada
Fokikos
Zakynthos
Panargiakos
Agia Paraskevi
Keravnos Keratea
Olympiakos Hersonissos

Separation into groups
The afore mentioned clubs were divided into two groups depending on their geographical origin. Most of the clubs that come from the southern part of the country (including Attica, Peloponnesus, Crete, the Aegean Islands and half Sterea Ellada) will enter South Group 1, while clubs from Central and Northern Greece (including Macedonia, Thrace, Epirus, Thessaly, the Ionian Islands and part of Sterea Ellada) will take part in North Group 2.

Southern Group

League table

Results

Top scorers

Northern Group

League table

Results

Top scorers

Play-off match

References 

Third level Greek football league seasons
3
Greece